The Fall of Tepic was an action during the Mexican Revolution, where two rebel commanders, Martín Espinosa and the American soldier of fortune, Emil Lewis Holmdahl captured the provincial capital of Tepic.

Capture

Emil Lewis Holmdahl and Martín Espinosa spent a while cleaning up coastal towns still loyal to Diaz and once most towns had surrendered, Espinosa and Holmdahl entered the provincial capital of Tepic. The federals did not often any resistance to the rebels and soon evacuated the city, while Holmdahl and Espinosa marched into the city and captured it. General Espinosa  began to ensconced himself and a growing entourage in the governor's palace and was clearing beginning to plot against Madero.

Aftermath

This resulted in a falling out between Espinosa and Holmdahl, and caused the latter to attack the former in the Battle of Tepic

References

Sources
Soldier of Fortune: Adventuring in Latin America and Mexico with Emil Lewis Holmdahl By Douglas V. Meed
Nayarit and The Mexican Revolution, 1910-1920 By. Wayne A. Sabesk
Mountjoy, Joseph B. (2013). "Aztatlan Complex". In Evans, Susan T.; Webster, David L. (eds.). Archaeology of Ancient Mexico and Central America: An Encyclopedia. Routledge
Taylor, Laurence D (1999) "The Magonista Revolt in Baja California". The Journal of San Diego History.

Mexican Revolution
Rebellions
1911 in Mexico
March 1911 events
Battles of the Mexican Revolution